The Hong Kong women's national volleyball team represents Hong Kong in international women's volleyball competitions and friendly matches.

It appeared at the Asian Women's Volleyball Championship 13 times.

The team also participated at the 2016 Women's Volleyball Thai-Denmark Super League.

References

External links
Hong Kong Volleyball Federation
Official website of Hong Kong Volleyball Association
Facebook page

National women's volleyball teams
Volleyball
Volleyball in Hong Kong